This discography documents studio albums and singles released by American R&B/soul singer and songwriter Stephanie Mills.

Albums

Studio albums

Compilation albums
In My Life: Greatest Hits (1987, Casablanca)
The Collection (1992, Castle)
The Best of Stephanie Mills (1995, Casablanca)
Greatest Hits (1985–1993) (1996, MCA)
The Best of Stephanie Mills (1997, PolyGram)
The Ultimate Collection (1999, Hip-O)
The Collection (1999, Spectrum)
The Power of Love: A Ballad Collection (2000, MCA)
20th Century Masters - The Millennium Collection: The Best of Stephanie Mills (2000, MCA)
Love Is to Listen - A Retrospective (2004, Expansion)
Gold (2006, Hip-O)

Singles

References

Discographies of American artists
Rhythm and blues discographies
Soul music discographies